In molecular biology, the  adhesin molecule (immunoglobulin-like) is a protein domain. This domain is found in mucosal vascular addressin cell adhesion molecule 1 proteins (MAdCAM-1). These are cell adhesion molecules expressed on the endothelium in mucosa that guide the specific homing of lymphocytes into mucosal tissues. MAdCAM-1 belongs to a subclass of the immunoglobulin superfamily (IgSF), the members of which are ligands for integrins. The crystal structure of this domain has been reported; it adopts an immunoglobulin-like beta-sandwich structure, with seven strands arranged in two beta-sheets in a Greek-key topology.

See also
Bacterial adhesin
Cell adhesion
Fungal adhesin

References

Protein domains